Glenn Thomas (June 13, 1991 – December 28, 2013), better known by his stage name Doe B, was an American rapper from Montgomery, Alabama. He was perhaps best known for being signed to fellow rapper T.I.'s Atlanta-based record label, Hustle Gang. Thomas was also known for his signature eye patch, the result of a shooting that occurred in 2009. During his career he released several mixtapes, including Trap Life (2012) and Baby Jesus (2013); he was also featured on the 2013 Grand Hustle compilation G.D.O.D. (Get Dough or Die). Thomas was shot and killed on December 28, 2013, at the Centennial Hill Bar & Grill, in his hometown of Montgomery. There have been two posthumous projects, D.O.A.T. 3 (Definition of a Trapper) and the compilation mixtape Doe B Presents C.B.M.: Choppaz, Brickz & Money, released by Doe B's own label, Cote Block Music.

Career
On November 22, 2012, Doe B released his first full-length project, a mixtape titled Trap Life, with Hoodrich Entertainment. The mixtape, which hosted by American disc jockeys DJ Frank White and DJ Scream, includes production from Lex Luger, Zaytoven, M16 and Will-A-Fool, among others.

He was signed to Grand Hustle Records by the label's founder T.I. in 2012 and appeared on Hustle Gang's G.D.O.D. (Get Dough Or Die) compilation mixtape, which was released May 2013. He appeared on four tracks, "Kemosabe", "G.D.O.D.", "Real Niggas" and the remix of his song "Let Me Find Out". Shortly after signing to Grand Hustle, Doe B had secured a recording contract with Interscope Records. Doe B later released his own mixtape, the 18-track Baby Jesus, in 2013. An alternative 21-track mixtape with 18 of the original and three more tracks was released and hosted by Maybach Music Group's DJ Scream. Doe B also released music videos for "Let Me Find Out" featuring T.I. and Juicy J, "2 Many" featuring Rich Homie Quan, and "Trap Muzik".

His debut studio album had been expected to be released in early 2014, on Grand Hustle and Interscope. Following his death, his management confirmed that his music would be released posthumously and that he had over 200 songs recorded. On December 30, 2013, a new Raekwon song, featuring Doe B and T.I., titled "I Wanna Know", was released. Later that day, Atlanta-based rapper Pastor Troy, released a tribute song to Doe B, titled "Y'all Ain't Do Him Right".  T.I. released his own tribute song, which features Doe B, titled "Flying with Angels". On January 9, 2014, T.I. revealed a teaser for a Doe B song titled "Why", featuring himself. It was said to be a track featured on Doe B's upcoming posthumous debut album. Then five days later, "Why" was released for digital download.

On April 1, 2014, Doe B's first full posthumous project titled D.O.A.T. 3 (Definition of a Trapper) was released. The mixtape features vocal guest appearances from T.I., Young Dro, Trae Tha Truth and others. The production was handled by Zaytoven, M16, K.E. on the Track and more producers. On iTunes a Deluxe Edition of D.O.A.T. 3 (Definition of a Trapper) was released on the same day. The Deluxe Edition features 6 more tracks than the original, having 24 tracks in a total. Big Kuntry King, T.I., Problem, Shad Da God are some of the guest appearances featured on the Deluxe Edition, that aren't on the original. One of those 6 tracks "Homicide" featuring T.I. was turned into the second single of D.O.A.T. 3 (Definition of a Trapper).
On June 13, 2014 Doe B Presents C.B.M.: Choppaz, Brickz & Money was released. It's a compilation mixtape by Doe B's own label Cote Block Music (CBM). The production was handled by Kartlin Bankz, 808 Mafia, Zaytoven and others. Doe B appears on seven tracks of the mixtape. A mixtape entitled The Best Of Doe B So Far was released at the end of 2015. Karltin Bankz later on released remixes of both "Trap Muzik" and "Hood Memories".

In early 2017, a new Doe B album cover of Doe B lying in his casket was released. The cover caused controversy and was later changed. Doe B's manager DJ Frank White, along with Doe B's mother, announced a new Doe B album, that would be released on June 13, 2017, Doe B's birthday. The album is titled No Life After Death.

Personal life
Doe B was born Glenn Thomas in Montgomery, Alabama, on June 13, 1991. He was the son of Shirley Thomas and Kenneth Aaron. He wore an eye patch as a result of a shooting in 2009. He had three daughters.

Death
On December 28, 2013, Doe B was shot at the Centennial Bar and Grill in Montgomery, Alabama. He was rushed to a nearby hospital where he was pronounced dead. A bystander, Kimberle Johnson, was also killed, and six other patrons were injured. The Centennial was housed in what was earlier known as the "Rose Supper Club", which was the subject of a shooting in December 2012 that left six people injured. It had also been the location of multiple shootings over the past seven years. The name of the venue had been changed after the most recent incident. After the latest shooting, Mayor Todd Strange ordered the club to close immediately.

On December 30, 2013, 25-year-old Jason McWilliams of Montgomery turned himself in to MPD detectives. He would then be charged with two counts of capital murder and held without bond. Montgomery Police Department detectives concluded that the "shooting stemmed from an ongoing dispute between McWilliams and Doe B." A second local 25-year-old man, Darius Thomas, was also arrested for the murders and charged accordingly. On January 3, 2014, a third shooting victim, 20-year-old Tim Hamilton, died from the gunshot wounds. On January 10, 2018, Darius Thomas was sentenced to 85 years in prison after pleading guilty to the deaths of Doe B, Kim Johnson, and Tim Hamilton.

Burial 
Doe B's funeral was held in Montgomery, Alabama on January 4, 2014. T.I. spoke at the funeral, praising Doe B and speaking about what a bright future in music he would have had.

On January 11, 2014, it was reported that three of the five surviving victims of the shooting were suing the Centennial Hill Bar & Grill. The plaintiffs, Keldric Landon, Clarence Young, Jr. and Ferro Bennett, filed lawsuits against Centennial, the Flight LLC, its owner Nicole Bankhead and the club's security company. Landon was the most injured, suffering multiple gunshot injuries requiring surgery. All three victims claimed in the lawsuit that the club's bouncers were bribed into allowing weapons into the building. They are seeking compensation for medical expenses, loss of work and pain and suffering.

On September 30, 2014, it was discovered that someone had tried to disturb Thomas' grave. His mother has expressed concern and is considering moving his body to an unmarked grave.

Discography

Album

Mixtapes

Singles

As lead artist

As featured artist

Guest appearances

Videography

As featured artist

See also
 List of murdered hip hop musicians

References

External links 
 
 
 
 Doe B on Myspace
 

African-American male rappers
1991 births
2013 deaths
Mass shootings in Alabama
Musicians from Montgomery, Alabama
Deaths by firearm in Alabama
2013 mass shootings in the United States
2013 murders in the United States
Southern hip hop musicians
Rappers from Alabama
Murdered African-American people
American murder victims
People murdered in Alabama
American shooting survivors
Grand Hustle Records artists
21st-century African-American people